Driving Big Davie is the sixth novel of the Dan Starkey series by Northern Irish author, Colin Bateman, released on 5 April 2004 through Headline Publishing Group. Bateman started the novel in response to the death of Joe Strummer, lead singer of The Clash, who he stated was a "huge inspiration on [his] teenage years".

Plot
Dan Starkey is invited to Florida by his old friend, "Big Davie", who has a spare honeymoon ticket after being dumped by his erstwhile fiancée. Starkey is back with his wife Patricia and feels he's gotten over the murder of his toddler son "Little Stevie" - however his wife disagrees and declares that an American road trip would do him good. When the opportunity to avenge Stevie's death presents itself, Starkey cannot refuse.

Movie
A movie adaptation of the novel was planned in 2001, with Steve Bendelack attached as director.

Reception

The novel received little but positive coverage in the media.

Reviewing for the Irish Post, Martin Doyle stated he found Bateman's novels to be "pitch-black comic thrillers" and called the novel "a helter-skelter of high jinks and low humour"; stating that while the novel is not "a demanding read" he found it to be "a rewarding one". Andrea Henry, in a review for the Daily Mirror stated that, at the prospect of Starkey's vengeance for his murdered son, "fast and furious murder and mayhem ensue", and called the novel "laugh-a-minute lad lit".

References

External links

Novels from Northern Ireland
Novels by Colin Bateman
2004 British novels
British crime novels
Headline Publishing Group books